South Arkansas River is a  tributary of the Arkansas River that flows from a source near Monarch Pass in the Sawatch Range of southern Colorado.  It joins the Arkansas just south of Salida, Colorado.

See also
List of rivers of Colorado

References

Rivers of Colorado
Tributaries of the Arkansas River
Rivers of Chaffee County, Colorado